The Stoney Littleton Long Barrow (also known as the Bath Tumulus and the Wellow Tumulus) is a Neolithic chambered tomb with multiple burial chambers, located near the village of Wellow in the English county of Somerset. It is an example of the Cotswold-Severn Group and was scheduled as an ancient monument in 1882. It was one of the initial
monuments included when the Ancient Monuments Protection Act 1882 became law.

The chambered long barrow was built around 3500 BC. Excavations in the early 19th century uncovered bones from several individuals.

Location and access
It is surrounded by a rectangular grass area accessed via a stile and footpath from a car park at Stoney Littleton Farm.

History
Chambered long barrows were constructed during the Neolithic between 4000 and 2500 BC for the ritual inhumation of the dead. Stoney Littleton Long Barrow was probably constructed around 3500 BC.

The tomb was first opened around 1760 by a local farmer to obtain stone for road building. The site was excavated by John Skinner and Richard Hoare in 1816-17, along with a labourer Zebedee Weston, who gained the entry through the hole which was made previously. The excavation revealed the bones (some burned) of several individuals. The mound was restored in 1858 by Thomas Joliffe. Some of the artefacts from the excavations are in the Bristol City Museum and Art Gallery.

It was scheduled as an ancient monument in 1882. Since 1884 the Stoney Littleton Long Barrow has been in state care, and is now managed by English Heritage who have provided an information board at the site. Further conservation work and a geophysical survey were carried out in 1999 and 2000 by the Cotswold Archaeological Trust.

Description
Severn-Cotswold tombs consist of precisely-built, long trapezoid earth mounds covering a burial chamber. The Stoney Littleton Long Barrow stands on a limestone ridge overlooking Wellow Brook and the village of Wellow. It is constructed from stone, including Blue Lias and Forest Marble quarried within an  radius.

The passage and entrance are roughly aligned towards the midwinter sunrise. The roof is made of overlapping stones. There is a fossil ammonite impression decorating the left-hand doorjamb.

Unusually, the barrow is not situated on flat ground and "looks as though it is sliding down the side of a hill."

Gallery

References

External links

QuickTime Virtual Reality Video

English Heritage sites in Somerset
History of Somerset
Stone Age sites in England
Barrows in the United Kingdom
Bath and North East Somerset
Scheduled monuments in Bath and North East Somerset
Archaeological sites in Somerset
4th-millennium BC architecture